Al-Rida al-Abyaḍ, known as The White Gown in English, is a 1975 Egyptian Arabic-language Egyptian film directed by Hassan Ramzi and co-written by Nairuz Abdel Malek. It sold  tickets in the Soviet Union, making it the seventh highest-grossing foreign film ever in the Soviet Union and the highest-grossing Egyptian film of all time.

Plot
Omar Bey's son Kamal fell in love and married a lady called Dalal. The marriage by Kamal was not approved by his father. Kamal died in an accident. His father Omar Bey drove Dalal out of the house after the death of her husband and took up responsibility of looking after her daughter. Later on, Dalal decides to steal from Omar Bay to buy some gifts for her daughter.

Cast
 Naglaa Fathi
 Ahmed Mazhar
 Magdi Wahba
 Youssef Wahbi
 Zahrat El-Ola
 Khaled Aanous
 Hassan Afifi
Layla Fahmy
 Badriya Abdel Gawad 
 Hayat Kandel 
 Hussein Kandil 
 Khadija Mahmoud 
 Manal 
 Salah Nazmi 
 Hoda Ramzi

Box office 
The film was released in the Soviet Union in 1976, selling  tickets in the country. This made it the highest-grossing foreign film of the year and the seventh highest-grossing foreign film ever in the Soviet Union. This also made it the highest-grossing Egyptian film of all time, with its Soviet ticket sales surpassing the worldwide ticket sales of all other Egyptian films.

See also 
List of highest-grossing films in the Soviet Union
Egyptian cinema
List of Egyptian films of the 1970s
List of Egyptian films of 1975
Salah Zulfikar filmography
Soad Hosny filmography

References

1975 films
1975 romantic drama films
Egyptian romantic drama films
1970s Arabic-language films